Gary George King (born 17 June 1990) is an English professional golfer.

King has played on the PGA EuroPro Tour since 2009, winning twice in 2015. He also played on the MENA Golf Tour in 2015, winning once.

King earned a 2016 Challenge Tour card through qualifying school. He won the fifth event of the season in May, the Montecchia Open.

King finished 24th in the 2016 Road to Oman, the Challenge Tour Order of Merit, and was back at qualifying school in November 2016 to try and move up to the main tour. He shot a final round 66 (−6) to get playing rights on the European Tour for 2017.

Amateur wins
2008 Skandia Junior Open

Professional wins (6)

Challenge Tour wins (1)

*Note: The 2016 Montecchia Open was shortened to 54 holes due to rain.

PGA EuroPro Tour wins (2)

MENA Tour wins (1)

Jamega Pro Golf Tour wins (2)

Team appearances
Amateur
Jacques Léglise Trophy (representing Great Britain & Ireland): 2008 (winners)

See also
2016 European Tour Qualifying School graduates

References

External links

English male golfers
European Tour golfers
People from Sutton, London
Golfers from London
People from Banstead
1990 births
Living people